The National Progressive Party was a political party in the Carniola region of Austria-Hungary. It was established in 1894 by Ivan Tavčar as the National Party of Carniola and renamed in 1905 to The National Progressive Party. It continued to operate under this name until after the First World War, when it merged with the National Party of Styria into the Yugoslav Democratic Party, only to be incorporated into the pan-Yugoslav State Party of Serbian, Croatian and Slovene Democrats less than a year later.

Political parties in Austria-Hungary
Defunct political parties in Europe
Defunct liberal political parties
Political parties established in 1894
Political history of Slovenia
19th-century establishments in Carniola
1894 establishments in Austria-Hungary
Liberal parties in Slovenia